So-hee, also spelled So-hui, is a Korean feminine given name. Its meaning depends on the hanja used to write each syllable of the name. There are 45 hanja with the reading "so" and 24 hanja with the reading "hee" on the South Korean government's official list of hanja which may used in given names. People with this name include:

Popular culture
 Ahn So-hee (born 1992), South Korean actress and singer, former member of girl group Wonder Girls
 Yoon So-hee (born 1993), South Korean actress
 Han So-hee (born 1994), South Korean actress
 Kim So-hee (singer, born 1995), South Korean singer, member of girl group Nature
 Kim So-hee (singer, born 1999), South Korean singer, member of girl group Elris

Sportspeople
 Kim So-hee (speed skater) (born 1976), South Korean short track speed skater
 Yang So-hee (born 1976), South Korean taekwondo athlete
 Jang So-hee (born 1978), South Korean handball player
 Bae So-hee (born 1993), South Korean sport shooter
 Lee So-hee (born 1994), South Korean badminton player
 Kim So-hui (taekwondo) (born 1994), South Korean taekwondo athlete
 Gim So-hui (born 1996), South Korean alpine skier

Other
 Kim So-hee (singer, born 1917), South Korean pansori musician
 Kim Sohyi (born 1965), South Korean chef
 Song So-hee (born 1997), South Korean minyo (traditional folk music) singer
 Sohee Park (born 1996), South Korean fashion designer

See also
 List of Korean given names

References

Korean feminine given names